Schmitt Mesa is a mesa in Antarctica named after Waldo L. Schmitt.
 It is a prominent, mainly ice-covered mesa, 15 mi long and 5 mi wide, forming the southern rampart of Latady Mountains at the base of Antarctic Peninsula.

It was mapped by USGS from surveys and USN air photos, 1961–67. Named by US-ACAN for Schmitt, marine biologist, Honorary Research Associate of the Smithsonian Institution. Schmitt was aboard Fleurus at Deception Island in 1927. He participated in the Staten Island cruise to Marguerite Bay and Weddell Sea in the 1962–63 season.

See also
Latady Island
Mountain ranges of Antarctica

References

External links
siarchives.si.edu

Mesas of Antarctica
Landforms of Palmer Land